Mary E. McAllister (April 20, 1937 – August 20, 2020) was a Democratic member of the North Carolina General Assembly representing the state's forty-third House district, including constituents in Cumberland county. As of the 2003–04 session, McAllister was serving in her seventh term in the state House. She was an executive from Fayetteville, North Carolina.

Electoral history

2010

2008

2006

2004

2002

2000

References

|-

1937 births
2020 deaths
People from Fayetteville, North Carolina
20th-century African-American women
21st-century African-American women
20th-century American politicians
21st-century American politicians
20th-century African-American politicians
21st-century African-American politicians
20th-century American women politicians
21st-century American women politicians
African-American state legislators in North Carolina
Women state legislators in North Carolina
Democratic Party members of the North Carolina House of Representatives